The 1919 Tennessee Volunteers football team represented the University of Tennessee in the 1919 college football season. The Vols won three, lost three, and tied three. This was the first varsity team for Tennessee since the 1916 season. Tennessee did not field official football teams in 1917 and 1918 due to World War I.

Schedule

References

Tennessee
Tennessee Volunteers football seasons
Tennessee Volunteers football